Horno Creek is a creek that empties into the Pacific Ocean through Horno Canyon on the coast of northern San Diego County on the Marine Corps Base Camp Pendleton.  It lies south of Foley Creek and north of Las Flores Creek.

References

Rivers of San Diego County, California
Rivers of Southern California